Ivona Matić (born 5 September 1986 in Dubrovnik, SFR Yugoslavia) is a Croatian female basketball player.

External links
Profile at eurobasket.com

1986 births
Living people
Basketball players from Dubrovnik
Croatian women's basketball players
Centers (basketball)
Power forwards (basketball)